Mucor velutinosus is a fungus first isolated from human clinical specimens in the US. It is closely related to Mucor ramosissimus, but differs in its ability to grow at 37 °C and produce verrucose sporangiospores.

References

Further reading
Sugui, Janyce A., et al. "Hematogenously disseminated skin disease caused by Mucor velutinosus in a patient with acute myeloid leukemia."Journal of Clinical Microbiology 49.7 (2011): 2728-2732.
Joichi, Yumiko, et al. "Detection of Mucor velutinosus in a blood culture after autologous peripheral blood stem cell transplantation: a pediatric case report." Medical mycology journal 55.2 (2014): E43-E48.

External links

MycoBank

Mucoraceae
Fungi described in 2010